XHETR-FM is a radio station on 99.7 FM in Ciudad Valles, San Luis Potosí, known as Radio Panorámica.

History
XETR-AM 1490 received its concession on June 25, 1944 and began operations as "La Voz de la Huasteca". It was owned by Tomás Oliva Bañuelos and broadcast with 125 watts. Later, it moved to 1120 with 1,000 watts. It was sold to Publicidad Popular Potosina in 1961 and remained a 1 kW daytimer for most of its history. It used the Radio Ritmo name in the 1960s and took on its present Radio Panorámica name in the 1970s.

In 2011, XETR was approved for AM-FM migration as XHETR-FM 99.7.

References

Radio stations in San Luis Potosí